St. Joseph's Technical Institute (SJTI) is a higher educational institute located in Pune, India. It was opened in 1959 by the Jesuits of the Pune Province, India. It trains middle-level managers – technicians with a combination of practical expertise, theoretical knowledge, communication skills, and management perspectives.

Through work-study programs and assistance from abroad, SJTI assists the economically and socially backward classes to respond to a need in industry. SJTI has served as a model for other vocational education and training schools that are being promoted by the Indian government.

The institute is a member of Skills for Progress, an all-India association of private technical and vocational training institutes, and prepares students for the National Council on Vocational Training (NCVT) examination in the craftsmen training schemed courses of the Maharashtra State Board of Vocational Examinations.

Courses
 ITI courses: Fitter, turner, mechanic (motor vehicle)
 Government of Maharashtra certificate courses: Computer operations, computer programming, electronics & radio servicing, advanced electronics & video servicing, computer hardware maintenance
 Autonomous courses (full-time): Fitter, turner, mechanic (motor vehicle), machinist, tool and die maker, fabrication fitter and welder, job inspector, A/C and refrigeration mechanic, audio-video servicing mechanic
 Autonomous courses (part-time): Mechanical draughtsman, tool & die designing, job inspection, auto electrician, motor rewinding, bench fitter, industrial hydraulics and pneumatics, computer operations basic and advanced, NC and CNC machines, electricity and electronics, domestic appliances repairs.

See also
 List of Jesuit educational institutions

References  

All India Council for Technical Education
Jesuit universities and colleges in India
1959 establishments in Bombay State
Educational institutions established in 1959
Technical schools